Wallace H. "Jay" Jordan, Jr. (born February 6, 1980) is an American politician. He is a member of the South Carolina House of Representatives from the 63rd District, serving since 2015. He is a member of the Republican party.

Jordan is Chair of the House Ethics Committee.

References

Living people
1980 births
Republican Party members of the South Carolina House of Representatives
21st-century American politicians
College of Charleston alumni